Reputation is a lost 1921 American silent drama film produced and distributed by the Universal Film Manufacturing Company and directed by Stuart Paton. Priscilla Dean stars in what was considered one of her finest performances.

Cast
Priscilla Dean as Fay McMillan, Laura Figlan, Pauline Stevens
Mae Giraci as Pauline Stevens, as a child (credited as May Giraci)
Harry von Meter as Monty Edwards (credited as Harry Van Meter)
Harry Carter as Dan Frawley
Niles Welch as Jimmie Dorn
William Welsh as Max Gossman
Spottiswoode Aitken as Karl
Rex De Rosselli as Theater Owner
William Archibald as Photographer
Harry S. Webb as Photographer's Assistant (credited as Harry Webb)
Madge Hunt as Matron
Al Ernest Garcia as Leading Man (stage sequence)
James McLaughlin as Heavy Man (stage sequence)
Kathleen Myers as Ingenue (stage sequence)
Marion Mack as Ingenue (stage sequence) (credited as Joey McCreery)
Alice H. Smith as Charwoman (stage sequence)
François Dumas as Char-man (stage sequence)
Joe Ray as Stage manager (stage sequence)

References

External links

1921 films
American silent feature films
Lost American films
Universal Pictures films
Films directed by Stuart Paton
1921 drama films
Silent American drama films
American black-and-white films
1921 lost films
Lost drama films
1920s American films